The Junior men's race at the 2002 IAAF World Cross Country Championships was held at the Leopardstown Racecourse near Dublin, Ireland, on March 24, 2002.  Reports of the event were given in The New York Times, in the Herald, and for the IAAF.

Complete results for individuals, for teams, medallists, and the results of British athletes who took part were published.

Race results

Junior men's race (7.974 km)

Individual

Teams

Note: Athletes in parentheses did not score for the team result (n/s: nonscorer)

Participation
According to an unofficial count, 122 athletes from 34 countries participated in the Junior men's race.  This is in agreement with the official numbers as published.

 (6)
 (1)
 (1)
 (5)
 (1)
 (6)
 (1)
 (1)
 (3)
 (6)
 (5)
 (2)
 (6)
 (5)
 (6)
 (6)
 (3)
 (6)
 (1)
 (1)
 (1)
 (5)
 (6)
 (5)
 (1)
 (1)
 (3)
 (3)
 (1)
 (4)
 (6)
 (6)
 (4)
 (4)

See also
 2002 IAAF World Cross Country Championships – Senior men's race
 2002 IAAF World Cross Country Championships – Men's short race
 2002 IAAF World Cross Country Championships – Senior women's race
 2002 IAAF World Cross Country Championships – Women's short race
 2002 IAAF World Cross Country Championships – Junior women's race

References

Junior men's race at the World Athletics Cross Country Championships
IAAF World Cross Country Championships
2002 in youth sport